Rossi's is a traditional historic ice cream parlour in Southend-on-Sea, Essex, and Weymouth, Dorset, England. The Original Rossi's Ice Cream is located at 12–14 Western Esplanade, Southend-on-Sea. The Original Rossi ice cream company was brought to Southend on Sea in 1931 by Massimiliano Agostino Rossi, known as Agostino, and his wife Anna. His first shop was at 37 High Street Southend on Sea. By 1932 he had opened shops at 1 Marine Parade and 12-14 Western Esplanade. In 1937 he was joined by his wife's cousin Pietro Rossi who took over the running of the shops at Marine Parade and Western Esplanade. Meanwhile, Massimiliano opened another shop at 99 Southend High Street. Rossi's Ices is also located at 92 The Esplanade, Weymouth, facing Weymouth Bay.
It was founded in 1937 by an Italian immigrant, Fioravanti Figliolini and has remained open continuously apart from a brief period during World War II. The premises feature original 1930s decor and were Grade II listed in 1997 as part of the Royal Arcade. As of April 2021, Rossi Ice cream (Southend-on-Sea) Ltd is now owned by Essex based entrepreneur James Sinclair.

History
In the 1920s, Fioravanti Fioravanti immigrated with his brother Peter and his wife Pasqua to England from Cantù, Lombardy, north of Milan in Italy. They initially traded as the Figliolini Brothers in Newcastle upon Tyne, before joining forces with Toni Rossi another immigration entrepreneur. In 1937, they were looking for new premises and decided to establish another ice cream parlour in the Royal Arcade at Weymouth, in four old shops. Fioravanti eventually took over the franchise from Toni Rossi but remained trading under 'Rossi's'. He set up his own ice cream parlour "Rossi's" on The Esplanade at Weymouth.

Modern day 
Rossi Ice Cream is still manufactured in Southend-on-Sea and supplies Rossi parlours, supermarkets, theatres and attractions around the UK.

In popular culture
In 2012, to coincide with the 2012 Olympics that featured sailing events in Weymouth Bay, the establishment was included in the Weymouth version of the Monopoly board game.

See also
 List of ice cream parlor chains
 Francis Rossi of Status Quo

References

External links 

 

1937 establishments in England
Restaurants established in 1937
Ice cream parlors
Buildings and structures in Weymouth, Dorset
Tourist attractions in Weymouth, Dorset
Restaurants in Dorset
Grade II listed buildings in Dorset
Ice cream brands
Buildings and structures in Southend-on-Sea
Restaurants in Essex